Mooren is a location on the Gwabegar railway line in north-western New South Wales, Australia. A station was located there between 1917 and 1974.

Mooren is also in the civil parish of Moorangoorang.

References

Localities in New South Wales